HMP Bronzefield is an adult and young offender female prison located on the outskirts of Ashford in Surrey, England. Bronzefield is the only purpose-built private prison solely for women in the UK, and is the largest female prison in Europe. The prison is operated by Sodexo Justice Services.

History
Bronzefield Prison was opened in June 2004 as the UK's new top-security prison for women.

Since its opening, Bronzefield has gained media coverage for its prisoners, its supposedly lax regime, high staff turnover and continued extremely poor industrial relations.

In 2009, a 77-bed unit was built on the existing site, taking the operational capacity up to 527. Plans also exist to further expand the prison to include a male section along the lines of HMP Peterborough (also run by Sodexo Justice Services), making it a dual prison holding males and females.

In 2012, it was reported that Bronzefield was the first prison in the UK to have its own branch of the Women's Institute. The branch is for members of staff and for inmates who are taking part in resettlement programmes ahead of their release.

The prison today
HM Prison Bronzefield is currently one of only two prisons to house Category A prisoners in the female estate (female and juvenile category-A prisoners are called "restricted status" prisoners). The prison is staffed by about 140 prison custody officers, in a ratio of 50% female and 50% male officers. Bronzefield is also a local prison, taking prisoners directly from the courts. Bronzefield holds a wide range of female offenders, including remand, sentenced and restricted status women.

Accommodation at Bronzefield is divided into four main residential units, each holding approximately 135 women. The prison also has a 12-bed Mother and Baby Unit, accommodating children up to 18 months old. Bronzefield has a Level 4 Healthcare provision with in-patient facilities for 18 women, as well as a smaller 10-bed Help & Direction Unit.

Bronzefield offers full-time education courses including Art, ESOL and Information Technology. There are also workshops in Cleaning Science and Arts and Crafts.

At least four times in the two years to 2019 women gave birth in upsetting and potentially dangerous conditions: one woman gave birth in her cell and another was left in labour during the night only with support from another pregnant prisoner.

The prison is run by Sodexo; its annual report and accounts for 2017/18 show the cost per prisoner at Bronzefield is £66,294, at least £10,000 higher than any other women’s prison.

Deaths in custody
Natasha Chin died after she had vomited continuously for nine hours and was not given medical attention or her prescribed medication. Prison officers asked healthcare staff to attend to Chin but healthcare staff did not respond.  Expert medical witnesses told a coroner's inquest that if Chin’s condition had been monitored and dealt with satisfactorily, her vomiting would have reduced. It is likely she would have survived if she had been moved to a hospital, experts said. Chin rang her cell bell but prison staff failed to respond because they did not know bells were faulty. The inquest jury found her death was due to "a systemic failure, which led to a lack of basic care", and her death was "contributed to by neglect". Since Chin’s death, three further deaths of women found unresponsive in cells at Bronzefield have happened. Earlier deaths and several inspection reports from at least 2010 stated long-established concerns about problems with healthcare services.

Deborah Coles of INQUEST maintained the Minister of Justice and Sodexo should be held accountable for not acting on repeated warnings about health care not being safe. Coles said, "Natasha’s death was a result of this indifference and neglect. It is shameful that women continue to die such needless deaths in prison. They failed to provide Natasha with even a basic duty of care. Urgent action is needed to dismantle failing women’s prisons and invest this money, not in private companies but in specialist women’s services to support women in the community."

In October 2019, a new-born baby died after the unnamed 18-year-old mother gave birth alone in her cell without medical supervision or help. "The case raises serious questions about how the woman came to be unsupervised and without medical support during her labour and birth, and about the conditions at the privately run prison". Ten or eleven different enquiries have been launched into the baby's death. There are questions over how the woman had no medical help during birth, and the case drew attention to what is done generally for pregnant women in prison. There has been previous unease over care of pregnant prisoners at Bronzefield and the prison faced criticism for transferring prisoners to hospital only when advanced in labour. Deborah Coles of INQUEST said, "There must be the most robust scrutiny of how this tragic death was able to happen and involve the relevant independent expertise on maternity care. It is vital that the family are able to fully participate and that the findings are made public." The Prisons and Probation Ombudsman reported many failings in the way the teenager was treated. Nobody came though the prisoner pressed her bell twice and asked for a nurse. The Prisons and Probation Ombudsman, Sue McAllister said: "Ms A gave birth alone in her cell overnight without medical assistance. Overall the healthcare offered to her was not equivalent to that she could have expected in the community." Prison staff on the mother's block did not know that the birth was imminent and health agencies did not share information adequately with the prison. The mother was vulnerable, it was her first time in prison, she was on remand facing a robbery charge. It was alleged she had “a troubled and traumatic childhood” and was “sad, angry and scared” after she was told the baby would be taken away at birth.

Inspections

A 2013 report by the chief inspector of prisons praised the institution for its efforts to tackle alcohol problems and self-harm, improvements in health care, and its induction, first night in prison and reception facilities, since however structures in staffing and management have changed these procedures. The report condemned their segregation practices, in particular for keeping a prisoner in segregation for five years in bad conditions, treatment which "appears to amount to torture".

Notable inmates

Current
 Marie Black
 Sharon Carr – Britain's youngest female murderer
 Roshonara Choudhry
 Nicola Edgington
Shauna Hoare
 Jennifer Johnson  – girlfriend of Russell Bishop at the time that he committed the Babes in the Wood Murders in Brighton in 1986, she was convicted in 2021 of perjury and perverting the course of justice after she lied about evidence in his first trial to help get him acquitted
 Jemma Mitchell
 Safiyya Shaikh

Former

 Jane Andrews
 Donna Anthony
 Tracey Connelly
 Tracy Dawber
 Joanna Dennehy
 Sabina Eriksson
 Jayda Fransen – former leader and deputy leader of far-right party Britain First
 Vanessa George
 Tracy Lyons
 Karen Matthews
 Fiona Onasanya
 Rosemary West

References

External links

Ministry of Justice pages on Bronzefield
Sodexo Justice Services information page on Bronzefield
HMP Bronzefield - HM Inspectorate of Prisons Reports

2004 establishments in England
Bronzefield
Bronzefield
Bronzefield
Prisons in Surrey
Private prisons in the United Kingdom
Ashford, Surrey
Sodexo Justice Services